Sidi Ameur district is an Algerian administrative district in the M'Sila province.  Its capital is town of Sidi Ameur.

Communes 
The district is composed of two communes.
Sidi Ameur
Tamsa

References 

District of M'Sila Province